The 1998–99 SM-liiga season was the 24th season of the SM-liiga, the top level of ice hockey in Finland. 12 teams participated in the league, and TPS Turku won the championship.

Standings

Playoffs

Quarterfinals
 TPS - JYP 3:0 (8:0, 3:2, 5:1)
 HIFK - Blues 3:1 (3:4, 2:1, 5:2, 3:2)
 Jokerit - SaiPa 0:3 (1:4, 3:4 P, 4:5)
 HPK - Ilves 3:1 (3:0, 5:4 P, 1:2, 5:4 P)

Semifinals
 TPS - SaiPa 3:0 (4:0, 3:1, 7:3)
 HIFK - HPK 3:0 (7:3, 4:2, 5:1)

3rd place
 HPK - SaiPa 7:2

Final
 TPS - HIFK 3:1 (3:1, 2:7, 5:2, 1:0)

Scoring Leaders

Qualification

1st round

2nd round

External links
 SM-liiga official website

1998–99 in Finnish ice hockey
Finnish
Liiga seasons